First Presbyterian Church is a historic Presbyterian church located at Waterloo in Seneca County, New York.  It was constructed in 1850 and is a monumental brick Romanesque Revival,  edifice. The facade features a large rose window and two soaring, square,  corner towers with octagonal spires.  A small -story chapel was added to the east elevation of the church in 1880–1881.

It was listed on the National Register of Historic Places in 1996.

References

External links

Churches on the National Register of Historic Places in New York (state)
Presbyterian churches in New York (state)
Churches completed in 1850
19th-century Presbyterian church buildings in the United States
Churches in Seneca County, New York
National Register of Historic Places in Seneca County, New York
Waterloo, New York